, (September 25, 1960 – March 11, 1999) was a Japanese manga artist.

Biography
Tada made her debut in 1977, when still a high school student, on Shueisha's "Deluxe Margaret" magazine. Tada's stories belong to the shōjo genre of manga and feature love stories centred on young female characters and their love interests. The storylines include comedic moments and are characterised by essential and sharp drawings.
Some of Tada's most popular works are Ai Shite Knight, Itazura na Kiss and Kimi no na wa Debora.

Ai Shite Knight portrays the Japanese rock music scene of the early 1980s. The anime series based on Ai Shite Knight was the first ever to feature original songs performed within the episodes. Another of Tada's works, Miihaa Paradise, is also set in the rock 'n' roll world.

Itazura na Kiss (Mischievous Kiss) - begun in 1991 and never completed - was by far Tada's most successful work in Japan. It tells the love story between Kotoko and Naoki from high school until after their marriage. The series inspired also an illustrated art book and two novels written by Nori Harata and published in Shueisha's "Cobalt" series. In 1996 a live action Japanese TV series based on Itazura na Kiss was also produced, starring Aiko Sato as Kotoko and Takashi Kashiwabara as Naoki. In 2005, the series was adapted into a Taiwanese drama under the name of It Started with a Kiss with lead actors Joe Cheng and Ariel Lin, and in 2008 an anime was also released. This series was also adapted into a Korean drama called Playful Kiss with lead actors Kim Hyun-joong and Jung So-min.  In 2013, a Japanese adaptation titled Itazura na Kiss - Love in Tokyo, starring Furukawa Yuki as Irie Naoki and Miki Honoka as Aihara Kotoko was released.

In 2015, a Thailand adaptation entitled Kiss Me starring Mike D. Angelo as Tenten and Sushar Manaying as Taliw was aired and has steadily earned the attention of fans from around the world.

Kaoru Tada died in 1999 of a cerebral hemorrhage. While moving to a new residence, she hit her head on a marble table and fell into a coma. Three weeks later she died at age 38.

List of manga
 Ai Shite Night (or Knight), 愛してナイト, serialized in Margaret, 1981–83, 7 volumes
 Itazura na Kiss (Mischievous Kiss), イタズラなＫｉｓｓ, Margaret, 1991–99, 23 volumes
 Itazura na Kiss Irasuto Shuu, 多田かおるイラスト集 イタズラなＫｉｓｓ, artbook published by Shueisha, 1 volume
 Kawaii Ojisama (A Fine Dad), Margaret, 1 volume
 Kimagure Enjeru (Capricious Angel), きまぐれエンジェル, Margaret, 1 volume
 Kimi no Na wa Debora (Your name is Deborah), 君の名はデボラ, Margaret, 1988, 2 volumes
 Debora ga Raibaru (Deborah's the Rival), デボラがライバル, Margaret, 1996–1998, 4 volumes (Available in English through Kindle and BookWalker.)
 Sabishigariya no Deborah, さびしがりやのデボラ, Margaret, 1 volume
 Horeru Yo! Koi, Margaret, 1 volume
 Ai Shi Koi Shi no Manon!, Margaret, 1 volume
 Kinta-kun ni Goyoujin!, Margaret, 1 volume
 Tiinzu Burabo (Teens Bravo), Margaret, 1 volume
 Miihaa Paradise (Fans' Paradise), Margaret, 2 volumes
 High School Magic, Margaret, 2 volumes

References

External links
 Kaoru Tada Official Site (in Japanese)
 Itazura na Kiss Fan Page
 Biographical information on Kaoru Tada (in Italian)
 About "Miihaa Paradise"
 

1960 births
1999 deaths
Women manga artists
Manga artists from Osaka Prefecture
Japanese female comics artists
Female comics writers
People from Neyagawa, Osaka
20th-century Japanese women writers
20th-century Japanese women artists
Deaths from head injury